Greatest Hits Volume Two is the second compilation album by American country music duo The Bellamy Brothers. It was released in 1986 via MCA and Curb Records.

Track listing

Chart performance

References

1986 compilation albums
The Bellamy Brothers albums
Albums produced by Jimmy Bowen
Albums produced by Emory Gordy Jr.
MCA Records compilation albums
Curb Records compilation albums